Sergio Andrés Camacho  (born March 14, 1973, in Caracas, Venezuela) is a Venezuelan-born Colombian judoka, who competed in the men's heavyweight category. Holding a dual citizenship, he captured a 2001 South American senior title for his own division, and had an opportunity to represent his naturalized nation Colombia at the 2004 Summer Olympics.

Camacho qualified for his naturalized Colombian squad in the men's heavyweight class (+100 kg) at the 2004 Summer Olympics in Athens, by placing fifth and receiving a berth from the Pan American Championships in Margarita Island, Venezuela. He fell short in a thirteen-second, earth-shattering ippon and an uchi mata (inner thigh) throw to naturalized Australian judoka and Olympic veteran Semir Pepic during their opening match.

References

External links

1973 births
Living people
Colombian male judoka
Olympic judoka of Colombia
Judoka at the 2004 Summer Olympics
Sportspeople from Caracas
Naturalized citizens of Colombia